The 1985–86 international cricket season was from September 1985 to April 1986.

Season overview

October

Sri Lanka in Pakistan

November

New Zealand in Australia

1985–86 Sharjah Cup

West Indies in Pakistan

December

India in Australia

January

1985–86 Benson & Hedges World Series

February

England in West Indies

Australia in New Zealand

Pakistan in Sri Lanka

March

1986 Asia Cup

April

1986 John Player Triangular Tournament

1986 Austral-Asia Cup

References

1985 in cricket
1986 in cricket